In functional analysis, a set-valued mapping  where X is a real Hilbert space is said to be strongly monotone if

This is analogous to the notion of strictly increasing for scalar-valued functions of one scalar argument.

See also
 Monotonic function

References
 Zeidler. Applied Functional Analysis (AMS 108) p. 173
 

Hilbert space